Declan Fraser (born 10 September 2000) is a racing driver from Australia. He currently competes in the Supercars Championship for Tickford Racing. 

He was the 2022 Super2 Series champion.

Racing record

Career summary

Supercars Championship results

Complete Bathurst 12 Hour results

Complete Bathurst 1000 results

Notes

References

External links
Driver Database profile

2000 births
Living people
Supercars Championship drivers
Australian racing drivers
Racing drivers from Queensland
Sportspeople from Mackay, Queensland

Engstler Motorsport drivers